1874 was the 88th season of cricket in England since the foundation of Marylebone Cricket Club (MCC). W. G. Grace become the first player to perform the “double” in an English season. In 21 first-class matches, he scored 1,664 runs and took 140 wickets.

Champion County 

 Gloucestershire

Playing record (by county)

Leading batsmen (qualification 15 innings)

Leading bowlers (qualification 800 balls)

Notes 
An unofficial seasonal title sometimes proclaimed by consensus of media and historians prior to December 1889 when the official County Championship was constituted. Although there are ante-dated claims prior to 1873, when residence qualifications were introduced, it is only since that ruling that any quasi-official status can be ascribed.
Some sources give Derbyshire and though this was once accepted in some publications, including Wisden on the basis of the "least matches lost" principle, it has been superseded.
Hampshire, though regarded until 1885 as first-class, played no inter-county matches between 1868 and 1869 or 1871 and 1874.

References

Annual reviews 
 John Lillywhite’s Cricketer's Companion (Green Lilly), Lillywhite, 1875
 James Lillywhite’s Cricketers' Annual (Red Lilly), Lillywhite, 1875
 John Wisden's Cricketers' Almanack 1875

External links 
 CricketArchive – season summaries

1874 in English cricket
English cricket seasons in the 19th century